Nathan Winston Kirby (born November 23, 1993) is an American professional baseball pitcher who is a free agent. He was drafted 40th overall by the Milwaukee Brewers in the 2015 MLB draft.

Amateur career
Kirby attended James River High School in Chesterfield County, Virginia. As a senior, he was the Virginia Gatorade Baseball Player of the Year after going 9–1 with a 1.24 ERA and 90 strikeouts in  innings pitched. He declared himself ineligible for the 2012 Major League Baseball draft after electing not to fill out certain drug tests and medical forms that are required by Major League Baseball.

As a freshman at the University of Virginia in 2013, Kirby pitched in 24 games and made two starts. He finished the season 4–1 with a 6.06 earned run average (ERA) and 37 strikeouts in  innings. Kirby was one of Virginia starting pitchers as a sophomore in 2014. On April 5 he pitched a no-hitter with 18 strikeouts against Pittsburgh. He was named the co-Atlantic Coast Conference Pitcher of the Year and was named to the All-ACC First Team. He was also an All-American by Louisville Slugger and Baseball America. In 18 starts in 2014, he was 9–3 with a 2.06 ERA. As a junior in 2015 he compiled a 5–3 record and 2.53 ERA in 12 games (11 starts). He was named to the All-ACC First Team for the second year in a row.

Professional career

Milwaukee Brewers
On June 8, 2015, Kirby was selected 40th overall by the Milwaukee Brewers in the 2015 MLB draft. The Brewers finalized his signing on July 17, 2015, a few hours before the signing deadline. After five appearances in the minors for the Single-A Wisconsin Timber Rattlers, where he posted a 5.68 ERA in  innings, it was announced that Kirby would need Tommy John surgery. Kirby missed the entire 2016 and 2017 seasons due to injury.

Kirby spent 2018 with the High-A Carolina Mudcats, going 3–5 with a 4.82 ERA in 27 games (11 starts). He missed all of the 2019 season after undergoing thoracic outlet surgery and fracturing a rib. Kirby did not play in a game in 2020 due to the cancellation of the minor league season because of the COVID-19 pandemic. He was assigned to the Double-A Biloxi Shuckers to begin the 2021 season, where he logged a 1.93 ERA in 17 appearances.

Pittsburgh Pirates
On July 4, 2021, Kirby was traded to the Pittsburgh Pirates in exchange for Kevin Kramer. He spent the remainder of the year with the Double-A Altoona Curve, but struggled to a 6.52 ERA in 17 appearances. He elected free agency following the season on November 7, but re-signed with the Pirates on a minor league contract on November 14, 2021. He was released on June 26, 2022.

References

External links

Virginia Cavaliers bio

1994 births
Living people
People from Chesterfield County, Virginia
Baseball players from Richmond, Virginia
Baseball pitchers
Virginia Cavaliers baseball players
Wisconsin Timber Rattlers players
All-American college baseball players
Carolina Mudcats players
Biloxi Shuckers players
Altoona Curve players
Indianapolis Indians players